Jeremiah J. Reardon   (September 1868 – April 22, 1907) was a pitcher in Major League Baseball in the 19th century. He played for the Cincinnati Red Stockings and St. Louis Maroons.

Sources

1868 births
1907 deaths
Baseball players from Missouri
19th-century baseball players
St. Louis Maroons players
Cincinnati Red Stockings (AA) players
Eau Claire (minor league baseball) players